Tororo Inland Port is a proposed dry port in inland Uganda.

Location

Overview
Tororo Inland Port is a proposed dry inland port. It is under development by Great Lakes Ports Limited of Kenya, who own the port and will operate it if and when completed. The port will serve as a storage area for containers of imports destined for Uganda, Rwanda, Burundi, Southern Sudan and Eastern DRC. The port will replace the ten or so storage facilities used by Uganda, to store these containers prior to the clearance of customs and other importation procedures. It is expected that this will greatly decongest the port at Kilindini, Mombasa, on the Indian Ocean, and cut down the time it takes for a container on a ship in Mombasa to arrive in Tororo, from 18 days to only five days.

History
Construction of the inland port was commissioned in June 2010 by Yoweri Museveni, the President of Uganda. The port was expected to be ready to commence business in November 2012. Construction was expected to cost US$120 million. The company that owns this transport infrastructure project is based in neighboring Kenya.

Since 2010, political, economic and regional issues have interfered with the development of this inland port. As of September 2021, it is not clear if the project will be completed.

See also
 Malaba, Uganda
 Tororo
 Uganda Revenue Authority
 Mombasa

References

External links
 About Great Lakes Ports Limited  
 Tororo District Internet Portal
 Approximate Location of Tororo Inland Port

Ports and harbours of Uganda
Tororo District